Arlene H. Ham-Burr (born August 1, 1936) is an American former politician. She served in the South Dakota Senate from 1997 to 2004.

References

1936 births
Living people
People from Belle Fourche, South Dakota
Businesspeople from South Dakota
Women state legislators in South Dakota
Republican Party South Dakota state senators
20th-century American politicians
20th-century American women politicians
21st-century American politicians
21st-century American women politicians